Dexter Walker (born 21 March 1971) is a Saint Vincentian retired international footballer who played as a defender.

Career
Walker played for the Saint Vincent and the Grenadines national football team between 1995 and 2007.

Walker took part in the 1996 CONCACAF Gold Cup, playing in two games in the competition: against Mexico and Guatemala. He also took part in 1998 and 2002 FIFA World Cup qualification.

References

1971 births
Living people
Saint Vincent and the Grenadines footballers
Association football defenders
Saint Vincent and the Grenadines international footballers
1996 CONCACAF Gold Cup players